Thomasia sarotes is a species of flowering plant in the family Malvaceae. It is an upright, spreading shrub with purple, pink to mauve or white flowers and is endemic to the south-west of Western Australia.

Description
Flowering occurs from August to December.

Taxonomy and naming
The species was first formally described in 1852 by botanist Nikolai Turczaninow and the description was published in the Bulletin de la Société Impériale des Naturalistes de Moscou. The specific epithet (sarotes) means "broom like".

Distribution and habitat
This thomasia grows in clay, sand, granitic and rocky soils on low ridges and dunes in the Avon Wheatbelt, Coolgardie and  Mallee.

References

Rosids of Western Australia
Plants described in 1852
sarotes
Taxa named by Nikolai Turczaninow